Branislav Vejnović (Serbian Cyrillic: Бранислав Вејновић; born 21 November 1988 in Sombor) is a Serbian footballer.

References

External links
 
 Branislav Vejnović stats at utakmica.rs

1988 births
Living people
Serbian footballers
Association football midfielders
FK Mladost Apatin players
FK Palić players
FK Inđija players
FK Radnički Sombor players
FK Hajduk Kula players
FK Mladi Radnik players
FK BSK Borča players
FK Sloga Petrovac na Mlavi players
Serbian SuperLiga players